The Chabot Museum is a museum dedicated to the Dutch painter and sculptor Hendrik Chabot in Rotterdam in the Netherlands. The museum is housed in a monumental villa in the Museumpark, near the Museum Boijmans van Beuningen and the Netherlands Architecture Institute.

History 

The museum opened in 1993.

As of 2016 the Chabot Museum awards the Hendrik Chabot Prijs, an award for visual arts, which was originally created by the Prins Bernhard Cultuurfonds.

Building 
The Chabot Museum is located at the Museumpark in Rotterdam Centrum, between the Netherlands Architecture Institute and the Museum Boijmans Van Beuningen.

It is housed in a white villa designed in 1938 for C. H. Kraaijeveld in the style of New Objectivity by architects Gerrit Willem Baas, a former employee of Brinkman and Van der Vlugt, and Leonard Stokla, a former bureau chief of Kromhout.

The villa has been a rijksmonument (national heritage site) since 2000.

Collection 
The museum is dedicated to painter and sculptor Hendrik Chabot. The museum collection includes works from the 1920s from the Schortemeijer collection and 26 works from the Second World War from the private collection of Mrs. Toll-Breugem.

References

External links 

 

Museums in Rotterdam
Houses completed in 1938
Art museums and galleries in the Netherlands
Buildings and structures in Rotterdam